Prince  was a Japanese Imperial court noble and statesman at the time of the Meiji Restoration. He held many high-ranking offices in the Meiji government.

Biography

Born in Kyoto, Sanjō was the son of Naidaijin Sanjō Sanetsumu. He held several important posts in Court and became a central figure in the anti-Western, anti-Tokugawa sonnō jōi ("Revere the Emperor, Expel the Barbarian") movement.

When the coup d'état of September 30, 1863, brought the more moderate Aizu and Satsuma factions into power, he fled to Chōshū. He returned to Kyoto after the resignation of shōgun Tokugawa Yoshinobu in 1867.
 
The first administrative offices (Sanshoku) of the Meiji government were established on January 3, 1868: the Sōsai (President), Gijō (Administration) and San'yo (Office of Councilors).  These offices were abolished on June 11, 1868, with the establishment of the Dajō-kan (Grand Council of State). In the new Meiji government, Sanjō was head of the Gijo, Minister of the Right (右大臣) (June 11, 1868 – August 15, 1871), and Chancellor of the Realm (Dajō-daijin) (August 15, 1871 – December 22, 1885).

Sanjō was awarded Grand Cordon of the Supreme Order of the Chrysanthemum in 1882. On July 7, 1884, his title was changed to that of koshaku (prince) under the kazoku peerage system.

Sanjō served until the abolition of the dajōkan system in 1885. After the Cabinet system was established, he became Lord Keeper of the Privy Seal of Japan.

In 1889, when Prime Minister Kuroda Kiyotaka and his cabinet resigned en masse, Emperor Meiji only accepted Kuroda's resignation and formally invited Sanjō to head the government. The Emperor refused to appoint a new prime minister for the next two months, making Sanjō the only Prime Minister of Japan (albeit interim) who also concurrently held the post of Lord Keeper of the Privy Seal.

In 1890, he assumed a seat in the new House of Peers in the Diet of Japan established by the Meiji Constitution. On his death in 1891, he was accorded a state funeral. His grave is at the temple of Gokoku-ji in Bunkyō, Tokyo.

Honours
From the corresponding article in the Japanese Wikipedia
Grand Cordon of the Order of the Rising Sun (29 December 1876)
Grand Cordon of the Order of the Chrysanthemum (11 April 1882)
Prince (7 July 1884)

Order of precedence
Junior fifth rank (31 January 1850)
Fifth rank (4 July 1854)
Fourth rank (22 May 1855)
Senior fourth rank (29 January 1856)
 Third rank (6 November 1862; degraded 1863, restored 2 January 1868)
First rank (12 June 1868)
Senior first rank (18 February 1891)

Ancestry

Notes

References 
 Beasley, William G. (1972). The Meiji Restoration. Stanford: Stanford University Press. ;  OCLC 579232
 Jansen, Marius B. and Gilbert Rozman, eds. (1986). Japan in Transition: from Tokugawa to Meiji. Princeton: Princeton University Press. ;  OCLC 12311985
 Keene, Donald. (2002). Emperor of Japan: Meiji and His World, 1852–1912. New York: Columbia University Press. ; OCLC 46731178
 Ozaki, Yukio. (2001). The Autobiography of Ozaki Yukio: The Struggle for Constitutional Government in Japan. [Translated by Fujiko Hara]. Princeton: Princeton University Press. ;  OCLC 45363447

External links

National Diet Library biography and photo
Meiji Dignitaries is a portrait of Sanetomi and others from 1877 

|-

1837 births
1891 deaths
19th-century prime ministers of Japan
Kazoku
Kuge
Meiji Restoration
Members of the House of Peers (Japan)
Politicians from Kyoto Prefecture
People of Meiji-period Japan
Prime Ministers of Japan
Sanjō family
Deified Japanese people